Codonodes is a genus of moths of the family Erebidae. The genus was erected by George Hampson in 1907.

Species
Codonodes louisiada Hampson, 1926
Codonodes rectigramma Hampson, 1907

References

Calpinae